Furdale, Saskatchewan is an unincorporated community adjacent to the southern city limits of Saskatoon, west of Highway 219 and on the east bank of the South Saskatchewan River.

Furdale primarily consists of acreages and luxury homes, and is considered a major bedroom community of Saskatoon. A similar unincorporated bedroom community, Grasswood Park, lies immediately to the east. Furdale is also the location of many of the Saskatoon area's major horse stable and breeding facilities. The province is planning to build a Perimeter Highway through Furdale in the coming years, which has sparked controversy among residents. Upgrades to Hwy. 219 (also known as Lorne Avenue) were completed during the summer of 2007 in order to handle the large amounts of traffic back and forth to the new Dakota Dunes Casino. An extension to the Circle Drive freeway, scheduled to open in 2013, will also benefit residents.

Furdale contains virtually no commercial or industrial development, with nearby Saskatoon offering these services. Furdale also relies on Saskatoon for its media, emergency services, etc.

Primary access to Furdale is via Lorne Avenue/Highway 219 from Saskatoon, and Grasswood Road from the east which provides a link to Highway 11.

Demographics 

References 

Corman Park No. 344, Saskatchewan
Designated places in Saskatchewan
Organized hamlets in Saskatchewan